The Croatia men's national under-18 and under-19 basketball team are boys' basketball teams, administered by the Croatian Basketball Federation, that represents Croatia in international men's basketball competitions.  The Croatia men's national under-18 basketball team (Hrvatska juniorska reprezentacija) represents Croatia at the FIBA U18 European Championship, where it has a chance to qualify to the U19 World Cup.

The Croatia men's under-19 team has achieved success in World Cup competition with one silver and two bronze. But has achieved even more success in European Championships with three golds, four silver and two bronze.

History
From 1964 to 1992 Croatia played under Yugoslavia. In 1994 the team participated in its first ever FIBA Europe Under-18 Championship as an independent entity. When Croatia men's national basketball team also with youth, U-19, U-16 and women's team joined FIBA in 1992 they then launched their own youth teams due to them being no longer with Yugoslavia. Their wins as combined stayed with the Yugoslavia team only. None of the teams wins were transferred to Croatia, as FIBA is concerned the U-19 team was formed in 1994 even though players from Croatia played for Yugoslavia. When Croatian Basketball Federation was founded on 19 December 1948 as a member of the larger Basketball Federation of Yugoslavia.

The team won their first medal in 1996 where they finished first for a gold medal at FIBA Europe Under-18 Championship.

U19 World Cup competitive record

Past rosters

U18 European Championship competitive record

Past rosters

See also
 Croatia men's national basketball team
 Croatia men's national under-16 and under-17 basketball team
 Croatia women's national basketball team

References

External links
 Croatia under-19 at Eurobasket.com
 Croatian Basketball Federation

Croatia men's national basketball team
Men's national under-18 basketball teams
Men's national under-19 basketball teams